KUSG (1350 AM) is a radio station licensed to serve the community of Hagåtña, Guam. The station is owned by Choice Broadcasting and carries a talk format known as "The Point".

The Point also airs on KUSG's FM translator, K227CT at 93.3 FM, and on the HD3 subchannel of KIJI 104.3 FM.

History 

MASI applied in 2004 for a new construction permit for a radio station on 1350 at Hagåtña. The application was approved on July 2, 2009; three years later on July 9, 2012, the new station began operations.

In 2017, KUSG was taken silent due to transmitter site problems and remained so for nearly a year. When it returned, it broadcast at 90 watts power because of a vandalized ground system. Delays related to elections in Guam kept a new lease from being secured. At 6p.m. Chamorro Standard Time on October 18, 2019, KUSG was taken silent, with MASI and its partner Choice awaiting necessary approval from the U.S. Army Corps of Engineers to clear the ground and rebuild; Choice is to buy the station from MASI when it returns to air.

Programming 

Initially known as "The Pulse", KUSG relaunched as "The Point" in 2017 under Choice operations. The station revamped its lineup, bringing The Rush Limbaugh Show, Sean Hannity and other conservative talkers back to the island's radio dial.

References

External links

GUM
Radio stations established in 2012
News and talk radio stations in insular areas of the United States
2012 establishments in Guam
Hagåtña, Guam